The Agenda Project: America the Beautiful 
In May 2011, The Agenda Project, New York-based non-profit political organization, released its “America the Beautiful” campaign, also known as “Granny off the Cliff.” The video was created in response to Rep. Paul Ryan’s proposed Medicare cuts, as part of The Path to Prosperity, the Republican Party’s long-term budget proposal.

The video dramatizes Paul Ryan's proposal to privatize Medicare.  The video – which shows an elderly woman getting thrown off a cliff – asserts that the Ryan plan will hurt elderly Americans.

Overview
The Agenda Project is a progressive public policy advocacy organization whose mission is to make regular Americans the driver of public policy.  The Agenda Project is the publisher of the Daily Agenda – an on-line hub for the progressive movement.  Erica Payne, the founder of the Agenda Project, is a political strategist, communications expert, policy analyst, and author.

Media coverage
The campaign garnered major media coverage, including:
 Over 145,000 views on YouTube
 8.9 million media impressions
 Featured on The O’Reilly Factor on FoxNews
 Played five times on The Sean Hannity Show on FoxNews
 Featured on The Caucus political blog of The New York Times
 Featured on The Ed Show on MSNBC

References

External links 
 agendaproject.org
 dailyagenda.org

Political campaign advertisements
Organizations established in 2011
Non-profit organizations based in New York City
Political organizations based in the United States
2011 establishments in New York (state)